The 2021 Toronto International Film Festival, the 46th event in the Toronto International Film Festival series, was held from September 9 to 18, 2021. Due to the continued COVID-19 pandemic in Toronto, the festival was staged as a "hybrid" of in-person and digital screenings. Most films were screened both in-person and on the digital platform, although a few titles were withheld by their distributors from the digital platform and instead were screened exclusively in-person.

Artistic director Cameron Bailey indicated that while the 2021 festival would not fully return to the size of program that it offered at the 2019 Toronto International Film Festival, it would be significantly bigger than the reduced lineup that was offered at the 2020 Toronto International Film Festival. Overall, the festival featured over 100 films, including a special retrospective program devoted to the work of Canadian documentary filmmaker Alanis Obomsawin.

Venues
In-person screenings were held at the festival's traditional venues, including the TIFF Bell Lightbox, the Princess of Wales Theatre and Roy Thomson Hall, the latter two of which hosted the world premiere of Stephen Chbosky's film adaptation of Broadway musical Dear Evan Hansen, the festival's Opening Night Gala Presentation. Denis Villeneuve's film Dune received an IMAX world premiere screening at the Cinesphere.

As in 2020, digital screenings took place on the Digital TIFF Bell Lightbox platform.

In addition to Toronto, the festival also staged a number of satellite screenings in other Canadian cities for the first time.

Awards

TIFF Tribute Awards
The festival presented the TIFF Tribute Awards, which were introduced in 2019 to honour actors and filmmakers for distinguished achievements over the course of their careers. The ceremony took place on September 18; as in 2020, it was broadcast by CTV.

The first two honorees announced were Alanis Obomsawin as the recipient of the Jeff Skoll Award in Impact Media and Denis Villeneuve as the winner of the Ebert Director Award. Jessica Chastain and Benedict Cumberbatch were subsequently announced as the recipient of the Actor Awards. Dionne Warwick received the special tribute award, filmmaker Danis Goulet was named the recipient of the Emerging Talent Award, and cinematographer Ari Wegner received the Variety Artisan Award.

Regular awards
The festival's main awards were announced on September 18, some live during the Tribute Awards broadcast and others on social media following the ceremony's conclusion. A few high-profile titles in the festival program, namely Dune, Last Night in Soho and Spencer, were not eligible for the People's Choice Award, as their distributors had not permitted them to be screened online on the digital platform.

Official selection
The first 13 films selected for the festival were announced in June 2021. The gala and special presentation programs were announced on July 20, while Contemporary World Cinema and Discovery titles were announced on July 28, TIFF Docs, Midnight Madness and Wavelengths were announced on August 4, Shortcuts and Platform were announced on August 11, and Primetime was announced on August 13.

Walt Becker's Clifford the Big Red Dog was initially selected to be one of the Gala Presentations, but was withdrawn from the festival, after US distributor Paramount Pictures pulled it from its release schedule due to the rise of the Delta variant of COVID-19.

The festival also announced a special event screening of an unspecified new film by Steven Soderbergh. Details of the film were not announced in advance, except that it was not expected to be his known upcoming film KIMI. Soderbergh ultimately premiered a reedited version of his 1991 film Kafka titled Mr. Kneff.

Gala presentations

Special presentations

Special Events

Contemporary World Cinema

Celebrating Alanis

TIFF Docs

Discovery

Midnight Madness

Wavelengths

Platform

Primetime

Short Cuts

TIFF Rewind
A new program which saw classic films that screened at TIFF in past years made available for streaming on Crave, paired with talks by actors or filmmakers involved in the production.

TIFF Cinemathèque

Coast-to-Coast Screenings
Special screenings of selected Gala or Special Presentations films in other communities across Canada.

Industry Selects
As in 2020 the Industry Selects program screened films for industry professionals, acting as a film market due to the continued COVID-19 pandemic having impacted the ability of filmmakers and critics to travel to international film festivals, but was not made available for the general public.

Canada's Top Ten
The festival's annual year-end Canada's Top Ten list, collecting the films named as the top Canadian films of the year by critics and film festival programmers from across Canada, was released on December 6, 2021.

Feature films
 All My Puny Sorrows — Michael McGowan
 Charlotte — Eric Warin, Tahir Rana
 Drunken Birds (Les oiseaux ivres) — Ivan Grbovic
 Learn to Swim — Thyrone Tommy
 Night Raiders — Danis Goulet
 Maria Chapdelaine — Sébastien Pilote
 Scarborough — Shasha Nakhai, Rich Williamson
 Ste. Anne — Rhayne Vermette
 Subjects of Desire — Jennifer Holness
 The White Fortress  — Igor Drljača

Short films
 Ain't No Time for Women — Sarra El-Abed
 Angakusajaujuq: The Shaman's Apprentice — Zacharias Kunuk
 Boobs (Lolos) — Marie Valade
 Defund — Khadijah Roberts-Abdullah, Araya Mengesha
 Fanmi — Sandrine Brodeur-Desrosiers, Carmine Pierre-Dufour
 Honour to Senator Murray Sinclair — Alanis Obomsawin
 Like the Ones I Used to Know (Les grandes claques) — Annie St-Pierre
 Meneath: The Hidden Island of Ethics — Terril Calder
 The Syed Family Xmas Eve Game Night — Fawzia Mirza
 Together — Albert Shin

References

External links
 

2021
Toronto
2021 in Toronto
2021 in Canadian cinema